Stephen or Steve Palmer is the name of: 

 Steve Palmer (footballer) (born 1968), English footballer
 Stephen Palmer (orienteer), British orienteer
 Stephen Palmer, guitarist with The High Strung